Domenico Maria Canuti (5 April 1625– 6 April 1684) was an Italian painter of the Baroque period, active mainly in Bologna and Rome.  He was a major painter of fresco decorations.  His ceiling decorations showed a mix of Bolognese and Roman influences.

Life

Born in Bologna, Canuti first trained in that city under Guido Reni, then with Guercino. He painted many ceiling and wall frescoes. From 1650 to 1660 and later in the 1670s, he was employed in Rome where he painted the quadratura decoration of the ceiling of church of Santi Domenico e Sisto with the Apotheosis of Saint Dominic. He was often patronized by the Olivetans. He was employed with Francesco Cozza and Carlo Maratta in the decoration of Palazzo Altieri. He also completed frescoes for the Palazzo Colonna in Rome.

Returning to Bologna, he completed frescoes in the library of San Michele in Bosco and the Palazzo Pepoli Campogrande, and in the Ducal Palace at Mantua. He helped fresco the Palazzo Felicini in Bologna with Domenico Santi and Giacomo Alboresi.  He employed Giuseppe Maria Crespi, Giovanni Antonio Burrini, Antonio Maria Haffner, Giulio Pisanelli, Girolamo Negri, and Giovanni Battista Caccioli in his studio. Many of these then went to work for Lorenzo Pasinelli. The Bolognese sculptor Giuseppe Maria Mazza initially trained in his studio; another pupil was the painter Lucrezia Scarfaglia.

Canuti was also active as an engraver. Among his graphic works are portraits of Ludovico, Agostino, and Annibale Carracci, The Virgin in the Clouds with Christ, and St. Francis Praying after Guido Reni.

Canuti died in Bologna.

Notes

External links

1625 births
1684 deaths
17th-century Italian painters
Italian male painters
Painters from Bologna
Italian Baroque painters
Catholic engravers